Cars is a 2006 American computer-animated sports comedy film produced by Pixar Animation Studios for Walt Disney Pictures. The film was directed by John Lasseter from a screenplay by Dan Fogelman, Lasseter, Joe Ranft, Kiel Murray, Phil Lorin, and Jorgen Klubien and a story by Lasseter, Ranft, and Klubien, and was the final film independently produced by Pixar after its purchase by Disney in January 2006. The film features an ensemble voice cast of Owen Wilson, Paul Newman (in his final voice acting theatrical film role), Bonnie Hunt, Larry the Cable Guy, Tony Shalhoub, Cheech Marin, Michael Wallis, George Carlin, Paul Dooley, Jenifer Lewis, Guido Quaroni, Michael Keaton, Katherine Helmond, John Ratzenberger and Richard Petty, while race car
drivers Dale Earnhardt Jr. (as "Junior"), Mario Andretti, Michael Schumacher and car enthusiast Jay Leno (as "Jay Limo") voice themselves. Set in a world populated entirely by anthropomorphic talking cars and other vehicles, it follows a hotshot rookie race car named Lightning McQueen (Wilson) who, on the way to the biggest race of his life, gets stranded in Radiator Springs, a run down town, and learns a thing or two about friendship, family, and the things in life that are truly worth waiting for.

Development for Cars started in 1998, after finishing the production of A Bug's Life, with a new script titled The Yellow Car, which was about an electric car living in a gas-guzzling world with Jorgen Klubien writing. It was announced that the producers agreed that it could be the next Pixar film after A Bug's Life, scheduled for early 1999, particularly around June 4; the idea was later scrapped in favor of Toy Story 2. Shortly after, production was resumed with major script changes. The film was inspired by Lasseter's experiences on a cross-country road trip. Randy Newman composed the film's score, while artists such as Sheryl Crow, Rascal Flatts, John Mayer and Brad Paisley contributed to the film's soundtrack.

Cars premiered on May 26, 2006, at Lowe's Motor Speedway in Concord, North Carolina and was theatrically released in the United States on June 9, to generally positive reviews and also received commercial success, grossing $462 million worldwide against a budget of $120 million. It was nominated for two Academy Awards including Best Animated Feature, but lost to Happy Feet (but won both the Annie Award for Best Animated Feature and the Golden Globe Award for Best Animated Feature Film). The film was released on DVD on November 7, 2006, and on Blu-ray in 2007. The film was accompanied by the short One Man Band for its theatrical and home media releases. The film was dedicated to Joe Ranft, the film's co-director and co-writer, who died in a car crash during the film's production.

The success of Cars launched a multimedia franchise and a series of two sequels produced by Pixar and two spin-offs produced by Disneytoon Studios, starting with Cars 2 (2011).

Plot

In a world populated by anthropomorphic vehicles, the Dinoco 400, the final race of the Piston Cup racing season, begins a rivalry between seven-time champion Strip "The King" Weathers, who is looking to win his eighth Piston Cup before retirement, consistent runner-up Chick Hicks, who has resorted to forced crashes to get ahead, and talented but arrogant rookie Lightning McQueen. At the back of the field, Lightning avoids a multi-car crash deliberately caused by Chick. While the other cars pit for new tires, he stays out to take the lead, which backfires when his rear tires blow out on the last lap. Chick and The King catch up, resulting in a three-way tie for first place; the tiebreaker race is scheduled for the following week at the Los Angeles International Speedway to determine the champion. Lightning is desperate to win the race, not only to be the first rookie to win the Piston Cup, but also because it would allow him to leave the unglamorous sponsorship of Rust-eze, a bumper ointment company, and take The King's place on the prestigious Dinoco team. However, he struggles to work with others due to his selfishness, which has caused him to fire three crew chiefs and have his pit crew quit after the race.

Eager to get to California as soon as possible, Lightning pushes his transporter, Mack, to drive through the night. While Lightning is sleeping, Mack nods off and is startled awake by a gang of delinquent tuner cars, causing Lightning to fall out the back of the trailer and onto the road. Lightning wakes up in the middle of traffic and speeds off the highway in search of Mack. Instead, he ends up in the rundown desert town of Radiator Springs, where he is chased by the town Sheriff and inadvertently damages the pavement of the main road. The next day, Lightning is ordered by the town judge and medical doctor, Doc Hudson, to leave town immediately upon seeing that he is a race car, but the local lawyer, Sally Carrera, requests that Lightning should instead be assigned community service to repave the road by a machine, to which Doc reluctantly agrees. Desperate to get to California, Lightning repaves the road shoddily in a rush to leave. However, Doc is unsatisfied, and he challenges Lightning to a race on the condition that if he wins, he can leave; Lightning spins out on a turn and crashes into a cactus patch, losing and being forced to restart on the road.

During this time, Lightning begins to warm up to the town and befriends several of its residents, notably going "tractor tipping" with rusty tow truck Mater and becoming his best friend. He also bonds romantically with Sally, who gave up luxury in Los Angeles to live in Radiator Springs and now dreams of putting the town back on the map. Lightning then learns how Radiator Springs was once a popular stop along U.S. Route 66 until it was bypassed with the construction of Interstate 40 and mostly forgotten, and that Doc was the Fabulous Hudson Hornet, a three-time Piston Cup champion whose career ended after a devastating crash in 1954. He eventually repairs the road and decides to spend an extra day in Radiator Springs helping the local businesses. He also earns himself a new set of tires provided by Luigi and Guido, and a new paint job provided by Ramone. However, Doc alerts the media of Lightning's location, leading them and Mack to descend on the town and force Lightning to leave in time for the race. Doc immediately regrets his actions after seeing the residents despondent by his unexpected departure.

At the race, as he could not say goodbye to his new friends, Lightning races distractedly and ends up one lap behind. He is then surprised to discover that Doc, after a change of heart, has taken over as his crew chief, and most friends from Radiator Springs are helping in the pit. Inspired and recalling tricks he learned from Doc and his friends, Lightning manages to recover and vaults into the lead. On the final lap, Chick performs a PIT maneuver and sends The King into a dangerous crash. Not wanting The King's career to end the same way as Doc's, Lightning stops just short of the finish line and drives back to push The King over the line so he can finish his last race, allowing Chick to win the race and the Piston Cup. As a result, the crowd and media angrily condemn Chick's victory but praise Lightning's sportsmanship. Lightning is offered the Dinoco sponsorship, but he declines and stays with Rust-eze out of loyalty for their past support. Back at Radiator Springs, Lightning reunites with Sally and announces that he will be setting up his racing headquarters there, putting the town back on the map.

Voice cast

 Owen Wilson as Lightning McQueen, a red race car who is described by John Lasseter in the Los Angeles Times as "a hybrid between a stock car and a more curvaceous Le Mans endurance race car"
 Paul Newman as Doc Hudson, a blue 1951 Hudson Hornet who is later revealed to be the Fabulous Hudson Hornet
 Bonnie Hunt as Sally Carrera, a blue 2002 996-series Porsche 911 Carrera
 Larry the Cable Guy as Mater, a brown 1951 International Harvester L-170 "boom" truck with elements of a mid-1950s Chevrolet 
 Tony Shalhoub as Luigi, a yellow 1959 Fiat 500
 Cheech Marin as Ramone, a 1959 Chevrolet Impala Lowrider who has different colors in each sequence of the film
 Michael Wallis as Sheriff, a black 1949 Mercury Club Coupe (police package)
 George Carlin as Fillmore, an aquamarine 1960 VW Bus
 Paul Dooley as Sarge, a brown green 1941 Willys model jeep, in the style of the US Military's usage
 Jenifer Lewis as Flo, an aquamarine 1957 General Motors Motorama show car
 Guido Quaroni as Guido, a custom blue forklift, who resembles an Isetta at the front who only speaks Italian
 Richard Petty as Strip "The King" Weathers, a blue 1970 Plymouth Superbird.
 Michael Keaton as Chick Hicks, a green race car described by Pixar as a generic 1980s stock car 
 Katherine Helmond as Lizzie, a black 1923 Ford Model T
 John Ratzenberger as Mack, a red 1985 Mack Super-Liner
 Joe Ranft as Red, a 1960s-style, red and silver fire engine (the design is most closely resembled to be a mid-1960s), and Jerry Recycled Batteries, a grumpy red Peterbilt truck who Lightning McQueen mistakes for Mack while he is lost trying to get to California. These were Ranft's last two voice roles before his death in August 2005.
 Jeremy Piven (US) / Jeremy Clarkson (UK) as Harv, Lightning McQueen's agent who is never seen on-screen
 Bob Costas as Bob Cutlass, a grey 1999 Oldsmobile Aurora and announcer for the Piston Cup races
 Darrell Waltrip as Darrell Cartrip, a grey, red, yellow, and blue 1977 Chevrolet Monte Carlo and Piston Cup racing announcer
 Humpy Wheeler as Tex Dinoco, a gold 1975 Cadillac Coupe de Ville and owner of Dinoco
 Lynda Petty as Lynda Weathers, Strip Weathers' wife
 Dale Earnhardt Jr. as "Junior"#8, a scarlet race car
 Michael Schumacher as Michael Schumacher Ferrari, a red Ferrari car
 Tom and Ray Magliozzi as Rusty and Dusty Rust-eze, a 1963 Dodge Dart and a 1967 Dodge A100 who are the owners of Rust-eze
 Richard Kind and Edie McClurg as Van and Minny, a purple 2003 Ford Windstar and a green 1996 Dodge Caravan
 Lindsey Collins and Elissa Knight as Mia and Tia, the red (later turning green, due to Lightning McQueen being stuck in Radiator Springs and Chick first arriving at California) identical twin 1992 Mazda MX-5 ("Miata") sisters
 Mario Andretti as Mario Andretti#11, a blue, white and red car
 Sarah Clark as Kori Turbowitz, a turquoise race announcer
 Jay Leno as Jay Limo, a blue car who appears in a cameo
 Jonas Rivera as Boost, a violet tuner car who is the leader of the Tuner Gang
 E.J. Holowicki as DJ, a blue tuner car and member of the Tuner Gang
 Adrian Ochoa as Wingo, a green and purple tuner car and member of the Tuner Gang.
 Lou Romano as Snot Rod, an orange tuner car and member of the Tuner Gang who sneezes often
 Jess Harnell (uncredited) as Sven the Governator, a light yellow Humvee caricature whose voice resembles that of Arnold Schwarzenegger
 Mike "No Name" Nelson as Not Chuck, a red forklift of Lightning McQueen's former racing team

Tom Hanks, Tim Allen, Billy Crystal, John Goodman, Dave Foley and John Ratzenberger reprise their vocal roles from previous Pixar films during an end-credits sequence featuring automobile spoofs of Toy Story, Monsters, Inc., and A Bug's Life. Cars was the final Pixar film worked on by Joe Ranft who died in a crash a year before the film's release, aged 45. The film was the second to be dedicated to his memory, after Corpse Bride. The memorial showed the roles he had done in the other films directed by John Lasseter during the credits. This is also the last (non-documentary) movie for Paul Newman before his retirement in 2007 and his death in 2008. It turned out to be the highest-grossing film of his career.

Production

Development

The development of Cars began in 1998, when Pixar finished production of A Bug's Life. At that time, Jorgen Klubien began writing a new script called The Yellow Car, which was about an electric car living in a gas-guzzling world inspired by The Ugly Duckling, an idea triggered by the poor reception his fellow countrymen gave the Mini-El car. Some of the original drawings and characters were developed in 1998 and the producers agreed that Cars could be the next Pixar film after A Bug's Life and be released in early 1999, particularly around June 4. However, the idea was scrapped in favor of Toy Story 2. Later, production resumed with major script changes, like giving Mater, Doc and a few other characters bigger parts.

John Lasseter said that inspiration for the film's story came after he took a cross-country road trip with his wife and five sons in 2000. When he returned to the studio after vacation, he contacted Michael Wallis, a Route 66 historian. Wallis then led eleven Pixar animators in rented white Cadillacs on two different road trips across the route to research the film. In 2001, the film's working title was Route 66 (after U.S. Route 66), but the title was changed to Cars in order to avoid confusion with the 1960s television series of the same name. In addition, Lightning McQueen's racing number was originally going to be 57 (a reference to 1957, Lasseter's birth year), but was changed to 95 (a reference to 1995, the year Pixar's first film Toy Story was released).

In 2006, Lasseter spoke about the inspiration for the film, saying: "I have always loved cars. In one vein, I have Disney blood, and in the other, there's motor oil. The notion of combining these two great passions in my life—cars and animation—was irresistible. When Joe (Ranft) and I first started talking about this film in 1998, we knew we wanted to do something with cars as characters. Around that same time, we watched a documentary called 'Divided Highways,' which dealt with the interstate highway and how it affected the small towns along the way. We were so moved by it and began thinking about what it must have been like in these small towns that got bypassed. That's when we started really researching Route 66, but we still hadn't quite figured out what the story for the film was going to be. I used to travel that highway with my family as a child when we visited our family in St. Louis."

Years later in 2013, Klubien said the film was both his best and most bitter experience because he was fired before it premiered and because he feels Lasseter wrote him out of the story of how the film got made.

Animation

For the cars themselves, Lasseter also visited the design studios of the Big Three Detroit automakers, particularly J Mays of Ford Motor Company. Lasseter learned how real cars were designed.

In 2006, Lasseter spoke about how they worked hard to make the animation believable, saying: "It took many months of trial and error, and practicing test animation, to figure out how each car moves and how their world works. Our supervising animators, Doug Sweetland and Scott Clark, and the directing animators, Bobby Podesta and James Ford Murphy, did an amazing job working with the animation team to determine the unique movements for each character based on its age and the type of car it was. Some cars are like sports cars and they're much tighter in their suspension. Others are older '50s cars that are a lot looser and have more bounce to them. We wanted to get that authenticity in there but also to make sure each car had a unique personality. We also wanted each animator to be able to put some of themself in the character and give it their own spin. Every day in dailies, it was so much fun because we would see things that we had never seen in our lives. The world of cars came alive in a believable and unexpected way."

Unlike most anthropomorphic cars, the eyes of the cars in this film were placed on the windshield (which resembles the Tonka Talking Trucks, the characters from Tex Avery's One Cab's Family short and Disney's own Susie the Little Blue Coupe), rather than within the headlights. According to production designer Bob Pauley, "From the very beginning of this project, John Lasseter had it in his mind to have the eyes be in the windshield. For one thing, it separates our characters from the more common approach where you have little cartoon eyes in the headlights. For another, he thought that having the eyes down near the mouth at the front end of the car feels more like a snake. With the eyes set in the windshield, the point of view is more human-like, and made it feel like the whole car could be involved in the animation of the character. This decision was heavily criticized by automotive blog Jalopnik.

In 2006, the supervising animator of the film, Scott Clark, spoke about the challenges of animating car characters, saying: "Getting a full range of performance and emotion from these characters and making them still seem like cars was a tough assignment, but that's what animation does best. You use your imagination, and you make the movements and gestures fit with the design. Our car characters may not have arms and legs, but we can lean the tires in or out to suggest hands opening up or closing in. We can use steering to point a certain direction. We also designed a special eyelid and an eyebrow for the windshield that lets us communicate an expressiveness that cars don't have." Doug Sweetland, who also served as supervising animator, also spoke about the challenges, saying: "It took a different kind of animator to really be able to interpret the Cars models, than it did to interpret something like The Incredibles models. With The Incredibles, the animator could get reference for the characters by shooting himself and watching the footage. But with Cars, it departs completely from any reference. Yes they're cars, but no car can do what our characters do. It's pure fantasy. It took a lot of trial and error to get them to look right."

Lasseter also explained that the film started with pencil and paper designs, saying: "Truth to materials. Starting with pencil-and-paper designs from production designer Bob Pauley, and continuing through the modeling, articulation, and shading of the characters, and finally into animation, the production team worked hard to have the car characters remain true to their origins." Character department manager Jay Ward also explained how they wanted the cars to look as realistic as possible, saying: "John didn't want the cars to seem clay-like or mushy. He insisted on truth to materials. This was a huge thing for him. He told us that steel needs to feel like steel. Glass should feel like glass. These cars need to feel heavy. They weigh three or four thousand pounds. When they move around, they need to have that feel. They shouldn't appear light or overly bouncy to the point where the audience might see them as rubber toys." According to directing animator James Ford Murphy, "Originally, the car models were built so they could basically do anything. John kept reminding us that these characters are made of metal and they weigh several thousand pounds. They can't stretch. He showed us examples of very loose animation to illustrate what not to do."

Character shading supervisor on the film Thomas Jordan explained that chrome and car paint were the main challenges on the film, saying: "Chrome and car paint were our two main challenges on this film. We started out by learning as much as we could. At the local body shop, we watched them paint a car, and we saw the way they mixed the paint and applied the various coats. We tried to dissect what goes into the real paint and recreated it in the computer. We figured out that we needed a base paint, which is where the color comes from, and the clearcoat, which provides the reflection. We were then able to add in things like metallic flake to give it a glittery sparkle, a pearlescent quality that might change color depending on the angle, and even a layer of pin-striping for characters like Ramone." Supervising technical director on the film Eben Ostby explained that the biggest challenge for the technical team was creating the metallic and painted surfaces of the car characters, and the reflections that those surfaces generate, saying: "Given that the stars of our film are made of metal, John had a real desire to see realistic reflections, and more beautiful lighting than we've seen in any of our previous films. In the past, we've mostly used environment maps and other matte-based technology to cheat reflections, but for Cars we added a ray-tracing capability to our existing Renderman program to raise the bar for Pixar."

Rendering lead Jessica McMackin spoke about the use of ray tracing on the film, saying: "In addition to creating accurate reflections, we used ray tracing to achieve other effects. We were able to use this approach to create accurate shadows, like when there are multiple light sources and you want to get a feathering of shadows at the edges. Or occlusion, which is the absence of ambient light between two surfaces, like a crease in a shirt. A fourth use is irradiance. An example of this would be if you had a piece of red paper and held it up to a white wall, the light would be colored by the paper and cast a red glow on the wall." Character supervisor Tim Milliron explained that the film uses a ground–locking system that kept the cars firmly planted on the road, saying: "The ground-locking system is one of the things I'm most proud of on this film. In the past, characters have never known about their environment in any way. A simulation pass was required if you wanted to make something like that happen. On Cars, this system is built into the models themselves, and as you move the car around, the vehicle sticks to the ground. It was one of those things that we do at Pixar where we knew going in that it had to be done, but we had no idea how to do it."

Technical director Lisa Forsell explained that to enhance the richness and beauty of the desert landscapes surrounding Radiator Springs, the filmmakers created a department responsible for matte paintings and sky flats, saying: "Digital matte paintings are a way to get a lot of visual complexity without necessarily having to build complex geometry, and write complex shaders. We spent a lot time working on the clouds and their different formations. They tend to be on several layers and they move relative to each other. The clouds do in fact have some character and personality. The notion was that just as people see themselves in the clouds, cars see various car-shaped clouds. It's subtle, but there are definitely some that are shaped like a sedan. And if you look closely, you'll see some that look like tire treads. The fact that so much attention is put on the skies speaks to the visual level of the film. Is there a story point? Not really. There is no pixel on the screen that does not have an extraordinary level of scrutiny and care applied to it. There is nothing that is just throw-away."

Computers used in the development of the film were four times faster than those used in The Incredibles and 1,000 times faster than those used in Toy Story. To build the cars, the animators used computer platforms similar to those used in the design of real-world automobiles.

Soundtrack

The Cars soundtrack was released by Walt Disney Records on June 6, 2006. Nine tracks on the soundtrack are by popular artists, while the remaining eleven are score cues by Randy Newman. It has two versions of the classic Bobby Troup jazz standard "Route 66" (popularized by Nat King Cole), one by Chuck Berry and a new version recorded specifically for the film's credits performed by John Mayer. Brad Paisley contributed two of the nine tracks to the album, one being "Find Yourself" used for the end credits.

Release
Cars was originally going to be released on November 4, 2005, but on December 7, 2004, its release date was moved to June 9, 2006. Analysts looked at the release date change as a sign from Pixar that they were preparing for the pending end of the Disney distribution contract by either preparing non-Disney materials to present to other studios or they were buying time to see what happened with Michael Eisner's situation at Disney. When Pixar's chief executive Steve Jobs made the release date announcement, he stated that the reasoning was due to wanting to put all Pixar films on a summer release schedule with DVD sales occurring during the holiday shopping season.

Home media
Cars was released on DVD, in wide- and full-screen editions, on November 7, 2006, in the United States and Canada. This DVD was also released on October 25, 2006, in Australia and New Zealand and on November 27, 2006, in the United Kingdom. The release includes the DVD-exclusive short film Mater and the Ghostlight and the film's theatrical short One Man Band as well as a 16-minute-long documentary about the film entitled Inspiration for Cars, which features director John Lasseter. This THX certified release also features an Easter egg in the main menu, which is a 45-second clip showing a Cars version of Boundin'. A VHS was released on February 19, 2007, to members of Disney's home video clubs.

According to the Walt Disney Company, fivemillion copies of the DVD were sold the first two days it was available. The first week, it sold 6,250,856 units and 15,370,791 in total ($246,198,859). Unlike previous Pixar DVD releases, there is no two-disc special edition, and no plans to release one in the future. According to Sara Maher, DVD Production Manager at Pixar, John Lasseter and Pixar were preoccupied with productions like Ratatouille.

In the US and Canada, there were bonus discs available with the purchase of the film at Wal-Mart and at Target. The former featured a Geared-Up Bonus DVD Disc that focused on the music of the film, including the music video to "Life Is A Highway", The Making of "Life Is A Highway", Cars: The Making of the Music, and Under The Hood, a special that originally aired on the ABC Family cable channel. The latter's bonus was a Rev'd Up DVD Disc that featured material mostly already released as part of the official Cars podcast and focused on the inspiration and production of the movie.

Cars was also released on Blu-ray Disc on November 6, 2007, one year after the DVD release. It was the first Pixar film to be released on Blu-ray (alongside Ratatouille and Pixar Short Films Collection, Volume 1), and was re-released as a Blu-ray Disc and DVD combo pack and DVD only edition in April 2011. The film was released for the first time in 3D on October 29, 2013, as part of Cars: Ultimate Collector's Edition, which included the releases on Blu-ray, Blu-ray 3D, and DVD.

Cars was released on 4K Blu-ray on September 10, 2019.

Reception

Box office
In its opening weekend, Cars earned $60 million in 3,985 theaters in the United States, ranking number one at the box office. For three years, it would hold the record for having the highest opening weekend for any car-oriented film until it was surpassed by Fast & Furious in 2009. In the United States, the film held onto the number one spot for two weeks before being surpassed by Click and then by Superman Returns the following weekend. The film then earned $33.7 million during its second weekend while competing against The Fast and the Furious: Tokyo Drift and Nacho Libre. Later on, Cars would team up with another Disney film, Pirates of the Caribbean: Dead Man's Chest, which was released a month later. Around this time, it had approached the $200 million mark, becoming the third film of the year to do so, following X-Men: The Last Stand and The Da Vinci Code. It went on to gross $462 million worldwide and $244 million in the United States. Cars was the second-highest-grossing animated film of 2006, behind Ice Age: The Meltdown.

Critical response
The website's critics consensus reads, "Cars offers visual treats that more than compensate for its somewhat thinly written story, adding up to a satisfying diversion for younger viewers." On Metacritic, the film has a score of 73 out of 100 based on 39 critics reviews, indicating "generally favorable reviews". Audiences polled by CinemaScore gave the film an average grade of "A" on an A+ to F scale.

William Arnold of the Seattle Post-Intelligencer praised it as "one of Pixar's most imaginative and thoroughly appealing movies ever" and Lisa Schwarzbaum of Entertainment Weekly called it "a work of American art as classic as it is modern." Roger Ebert of the Chicago Sun-Times gave the film three out of four stars, saying that it "tells a bright and cheery story, and then has a little something profound lurking around the edges. In this case, it's a sense of loss." Peter Travers of Rolling Stone gave the film three and a half stars out of four, saying "Fueled with plenty of humor, action, heartfelt drama, and amazing new technical feats, Cars is a high octane delight for moviegoers of all ages." Richard Corliss of Time gave the film a positive review, saying "Existing both in turbo-charged today and the gentler '50s, straddling the realms of Pixar styling and old Disney heart, this new-model Cars is an instant classic." Brian Lowry of Variety gave the film a negative review, saying "Despite representing another impressive technical achievement, it's the least visually interesting of the computer-animation boutique's movies, and -- in an ironic twist for a story about auto racing -- drifts slowly through its semi-arid midsection." Robert Wilonsky of The Village Voice gave the film a positive review, saying "What ultimately redeems Cars from turning out a total lemon is its soul. Lasseter loves these animated inanimate objects as though they were kin, and it shows in every beautifully rendered frame." Ella Taylor of L.A. Weekly gave the film a positive review, saying "Cars cheerfully hitches cutting-edge animation to a folksy narrative plugging friendship, community and a Luddite mistrust of high tech."

Gene Seymour of Newsday gave the film three out of four stars, saying "And as pop flies go, Cars is pretty to watch, even as it loops, drifts and, at times, looks as if it's just hanging in midair." Colin Covert of the Star Tribune gave the film a positive review, saying "It takes everything that's made Pixar shorthand for animation excellence -- strong characters, tight pacing, spot-on voice casting, a warm sense of humor and visuals that are pure, pixilated bliss -- and carries them to the next stage." Kenneth Turan of the Los Angeles Times gave the film four out of five stars, saying "What's surprising about this supremely engaging film is the source of its curb appeal: It has heart." Stephen Hunter of The Washington Post gave the film a positive review, saying "It's the latest concoction from the geniuses at Pixar, probably the most inventive of the Computer Generated Imagery shop -- and the film's great fun, if well under the level of the first Toy Story." Jessica Reaves of the Chicago Tribune gave the film two and a half stars out of four, saying "While it's a technically perfect movie, its tone is too manic, its characters too jaded and, in the end, its story too empty to stand up to expectations." James Berardinelli of ReelViews gave the film three out of four stars, saying "While Cars may cross the finish line ahead of any of 2006's other animated films, it's several laps behind its Pixar siblings." Lisa Kennedy of The Denver Post gave the film three out of four stars, saying "Cars idles at times. And it's not until its final laps that the movie gains the emotional traction we've come to expect from the Toy Story and Nemo crews." Amy Biancolli of the Houston Chronicle gave the film three out of four stars, saying "It thunders ahead with breezy abandon, scoring big grins on its way."

Claudia Puig of USA Today gave the film a positive review, saying "The animation is stunningly rendered. But the story is always the critical element in Pixar movies, and Cars''' story is heartfelt with a clear and unabashed moral." David Edelstein of New York Magazine gave the film a positive review, saying "Like the Toy Story films, Cars is a state-of-the-computer-art plea on behalf of outmoded, wholesome fifties technology, with a dash of Zen by way of George Lucas." Moira MacDonald of The Seattle Times gave the film three and a half stars out of four, saying "Though the central idea of nostalgia for a quieter, small-town life may well be lost on this movie's young audience -- Cars finds a pleasant and often sparkling groove." Mick LaSalle of the San Francisco Chronicle gave the film two out of five stars, saying "Cars might get us into car world as a gimmick, but it doesn't get us into car world as a state of mind. Thus, the animation, rather than seeming like an expression of the movie's deeper truth, becomes an impediment to it." Derek Adams of Time Out gave the film a positive review, saying "There are many other brilliant scenes, some just as funny but there are just as many occasions where you feel the film's struggling to fire on all cylinders. Still, it's a Pixar film, right? And they're always worth a gander no matter what anyone says."

AccoladesCars had a highly successful run during the 2006 awards season. Many film critic associations such as the Broadcast Film Critics Association and the National Board of Review named it the best Animated Feature Film of 2006. Cars also received the title of Best Reviewed Animated Feature of 2006 from Rotten Tomatoes. Randy Newman and James Taylor received a Grammy Award for the song "Our Town," which later went on to be nominated for the Academy Award for Best Original Song (an award it lost to "I Need to Wake Up" from An Inconvenient Truth). The film also earned an Oscar nomination for Best Animated Feature alongside Monster House, but both films lost to Happy Feet. Cars was also selected as the Favorite Family Movie at the 33rd People's Choice Awards. The most prestigious award that Cars received was the inaugural Golden Globe Award for Best Animated Feature Film. Cars also won the highest award for animation in 2006, the Best Animated Feature Annie Award.  In 2008, the American Film Institute nominated this film for its Top 10 Animation Films list.

Video game

A video game of the same name was released on June 6, 2006, for Game Boy Advance, Microsoft Windows, Nintendo DS, Nintendo GameCube, PlayStation 2, PlayStation Portable and Xbox. It was also released on October 23, 2006, for Xbox 360 and November 16, 2006, for Wii. Much like the film, the video game got mainly positive reviews. GameSpot gave 7.0 out of 10 for Xbox 360, Wii, and PlayStation 2 versions, 7.6 out of 10 for the GameCube and Xbox versions, and 7.4 out of 10 for the PSP version. Metacritic gave 65 out of 100 for the Wii version, 54 out of 100 for the DS version, 73 out of 100 for the PC version, 71 out of 100 for the PlayStation 2 version, and 70 out of 100 for the PSP version.

Similar films
Marco Aurélio Canônico of Folha de S.Paulo described The Little Cars series (Os Carrinhos in Portuguese), a Brazilian computer graphics film series by Vídeo Brinquedo, as a derivative of Cars. Canônico discussed whether lawsuits from Pixar would appear. The Brazilian Ministry of Culture posted Marcus Aurelius Canônico's article on its website.

It has also been noted that the plot of Cars mirrors that of Doc Hollywood, a 1991 romantic comedy which stars Michael J. Fox as a hotshot young doctor who eventually acquires an appreciation for small town values and falls in love with a local law student as result of being sentenced to work at the town hospital after causing a traffic collision in a small town. Some have gone so far as to say that the makers of Cars plagiarized the script of Doc Hollywood.

Literature
 2006: CARS: The Junior Novelization, RH/Disney, 

Expanded franchise

Sequels

The first sequel, titled Cars 2, was released on June 24, 2011. It was directed again by John Lasseter, who was inspired for the film while traveling around the world promoting the first film. In the sequel, Lightning McQueen and Mater head to Japan and Europe to compete in the World Grand Prix, but Mater becomes sidetracked with international espionage.

The second sequel, titled Cars 3, was released on June 16, 2017. Directed by Brian Fee, the film focuses on Lightning McQueen, now a veteran racer, who after being overshadowed by a new wave of rookies, gets help from a young race car, Cruz Ramirez, to instruct him for the increasingly high-tech world and defeat new rival Jackson Storm.

Spin-offs

An animated feature film spin-off called Planes, produced by DisneyToon Studios, was released on August 9, 2013. A sequel to Planes, titled Planes: Fire & Rescue, was released on July 18, 2014.

Television seriesCars has also spawned a television series of short films titled Cars Toons, which ran from October 27, 2008, to June 5, 2012 (as Mater's Tall Tales) and March 22, 2013, to May 20, 2014 (as Tales from Radiator Springs). A Disney+ streaming series, titled Cars on the Road, premiered on September 8, 2022.

See also
 Mandeville-Anthony v. Walt Disney Co., a federal court case in which Mandeville claimed Disney infringed on his copyrighted ideas by creating Cars''

References

External links

  from Disney
  from Pixar
 
 
 
 
 

2006 comedy films
2006 computer-animated films
2006 films
2000s American animated films
2000s buddy comedy films
2000s children's animated films
2000s children's comedy films
2000s comedy road movies
2000s sports comedy films
2000s English-language films
American buddy comedy films
American children's animated comedy films
American comedy road movies
American sports comedy films
American animated feature films
Animated buddy films
Animated sports films
Best Animated Feature Annie Award winners
Best Animated Feature Broadcast Film Critics Association Award winners
Best Animated Feature Film Golden Globe winners
Cars (franchise)
Disney controversies
Films about automobiles
Films adapted into television shows
Films directed by John Lasseter
Film controversies
Films involved in plagiarism controversies
Films produced by Darla K. Anderson
Animated films set in California
Films set in deserts
Films scored by Randy Newman
Films with screenplays by Dan Fogelman
Films with screenplays by John Lasseter
Films with screenplays by Joe Ranft
Pixar animated films
U.S. Route 66
Walt Disney Pictures animated films
Films set in Arizona